
The Young Ambassadors are a song and dance performing group from Brigham Young University (BYU). Consisting of 20 performers, 10 male and 10 female, they were founded by Janie Thompson in 1969. Since their first international performance at the 1970 World Fair in Osaka, Japan, they have performed in over 68 countries.

History
Ernest L. Wilkinson, then president of BYU, asked Janie Thompson, who had just returned from a mission for the Church of Jesus Christ of Latter-day Saints (LDS Church), to found the Program Bureau in 1952. She accepted Wilkinson's request, though she had to reject an offer from the Ike Carpenter band. BYU was invited to send a group to represent the United States at the 1970 World Fair in Osaka, Japan. Assisted by Harry Schultz, Thompson had created a performing group in 1969 called the Brigham Young Ambassadors. "Brigham" was dropped from the name in 1970 and the group became known as Young Ambassadors. Randy Boothe, the current director of the group, was recruited for the show. The audience received the group well and the Young Ambassadors continued to receive invitations to perform in front of international audiences. Before a tour, group members study the language and culture of the countries they tour so they can better interact with the people in the country.

Since their first international performance at world exposition 1970 in Osaka, Japan, they have performed their musical variety show throughout the United States and over 68 other nations. Their audiences have included the prime minister of India, the queen of Thailand, and the king and queen of Jordan.  Live and televised appearances in major concert halls and impromptu performances in hospitals, orphanages, town squares and government palaces reach millions of people each year.

The Young Ambassadors company consists of 20 performers (10 men and 10 women), a 10 piece show band (keyboard, drums, guitar and bass guitar, etc.) and technical personnel. The Young Ambassadors have been directed by Randy Boothe since 1978.

Impact
The Young Ambassadors were the first organized group to represent the Church of Jesus Christ of Latter-day Saints (LDS Church) or BYU in the Soviet Union.

In a 1991 speech at BYU, Dallin H. Oaks discussed how the Young Ambassadors overcame the challenges of trying to perform in China in 1978. The challenges were due to the lack of diplomatic relations between China and the United States at the time and the fact that United States tourists were not welcome there. Oaks related the 1978 tour and subsequent tours of the Young Ambassadors to China as contributive to missionary work of LDS Church in China and around the world. Chinese nobility were impressed by the Young Ambassadors, and continued to let them perform in China, even when visits from other performing groups were cancelled. Along with Oaks, French scholar Pierre Vendassi agreed that the performances of the Young Ambassadors in Beijing and other Chinese cities helped establish a relationship between China and the LDS Church.

Past members
 Sharlene Wells Hawkes, Miss America 1985
 Candese Marchese, Eponine in Broadway cast of Les Misérables
 Christeena Michelle Riggs, Eponine in Broadway cast of Les Misérables, Cosette in the 10th Anniversary Production.
 Dan Truman, country music group Diamond Rio keyboardist
 Emily Tyndall, actress in Napoleon Dynamite
 Dallyn Vail Bayles, LDS recording artist, Understudy of Phantom and Raoul in Phantom of the Opera US Tour, Enjolras in US National Tour of Les Mis
Jeff Whiting, associate choreographer to Susan Stroman, founder of Open Jar Institute in NY, creator of Stage Write Software
Summer Naomi Smart, Joseph Jefferson Award winning actress

Directors
Harry Schultz , Director 1970 - 1974

 Randy Boothe, Artistic Director
 Eric Hansen, Band Director
 Ron Simpson, Associate Director (retired) 
 Janielle Christensen, Assistant Artistic Director
 John Shurtleff, Technical Director

Tour history
This tour history beings in 1970 and continues up to present day.
 1970 Japan (Osaka World Exposition)
 1972 California, Alberta, Idaho, Utah, Wyoming, Montana, Eastern United States
 1972-1973 New Mexico, Mexico, Guatemala, Costa Rica, Colombia, Peru, Bolivia, Argentina, Uruguay, Brazil, El Salvador
 1973-1974 Midwestern United States, Southern California, Nevada, Utah
 1975 Utah, Arizona, California, Northern California, Eastern United States, Canada
 1975-1976 Southern United States, Central United States, Alberta, California, Nevada, Utah
 1977 Arizona, Netherlands, Germany, France, Belgium, Switzerland
 1978 California, Utah, New Mexico, Texas, Central Canada, Midwestern United States, Eastern United States
 1979 Arizona, New Mexico, California, Northern United States, Canada, Poland, Austria, Germany, Switzerland, People's Republic of China, Republic of China Hong Kong, Guam, Hawaii, California
 1980 India, Nepal, Sri Lanka, Arizona, New Mexico, Southern United States, Hawaii, People's Republic of China, Philippines, Hong Kong
 1980-1981 Romania, Egypt, Greece, Northern California, Colorado, Wyoming, Denmark, Iceland, Sweden, Finland, Norway
 1981-1982 Arizona, Northwest United States, India, Sri Lanka, San Diego, California (Holiday Bowl), Southern California, Egypt, Turkey, Jordan, New York, Tennessee World Exposition,
 1983 Utah, Southern California, Idaho, Washington, California (twice), Nevada, Japan, People's Republic of China, Republic of China, Thailand, Singapore, Malaysia, Australia, New Zealand, Tahiti, Hawaii
 1984 Arizona, Utah, Southern California, Louisiana World Exposition, Southern United States, Northeastern United States
 1985 Southern California, Nevada, Northern California, Yugoslavia, Italy, France, Spain, Portugal, Austria, Egypt, Jordan, Turkey, Greece, Jerash
 1986 California, India, Nepal, Sri Lanka, Canada
 1987-1988 Colorado, Missouri, Pennsylvania, New Jersey, New York, Washington D.C., New Hampshire, Maine, New Brunswick, Prince Edward Island, Nova Scotia, Quebec, Ontario, Ohio, Illinois, Idaho, Oregon, Washington, United Kingdom, Ireland
 1988-1989 Northern California, Georgia, Florida, Puerto Rico, Dominican Republic, Jamaica
 1989-1990 Utah, Nevada, California, Denmark, Norway, Sweden, Finland
 1991 New Mexico, Texas, Soviet Union
 1991-1992 Arizona, Colorado, Kansas, Missouri, Arkansas, Tennessee, North Carolina, Virginia, Washington D.C., Pennsylvania, West Virginia, Ohio, Kentucky
 1992-1993 Northern Nevada, California, Russia, Lithuania, Latvia, Estonia
 1993-1994 Pacific Northwest, Spain, Morocco, Tunisia, Egypt
 1994-1995 Colorado, Wyoming, Nebraska, Kansas, Missouri, Illinois, Iowa, Minnesota
 1996 Southern California, Vietnam, Hong Kong, People's Republic of China, Philippines, Malaysia
 1997 Arizona, Morocco, Tunisia
 1998 California, South Africa, Swaziland, Botswana
 1999 Washington, Oregon, Idaho, Singapore, Malaysia, Thailand, China
 2000 California, Nevada, Colorado, Texas, Oklahoma, Arkansas, Tennessee, Alabama, Georgia
 2001 Arizona, Far East Russia, Japan
 2002 Oregon, Washington, British Columbia, Alberta, Canada
 2003 California, Northern Nevada
 2004 Southern Nevada, California, Brazil, Argentina
 2005 Colorado, New Mexico, Hong Kong, China, South Korea
 2006 Arizona, Texas, Oklahoma, Kansas, Missouri, Illinois
 2007 China, Idaho, Washington, Oregon
 2008 Australia, Tasmania, Nevada, Southern California
 2009 New Mexico, Texas, Denmark, Norway, Sweden, Finland
 2010 Arizona, Illinois
 2011 North Carolina, South Carolina, Tennessee, Virginia, Alabama, Georgia, Florida, Cuba, Nevada, California
 2012 South Africa, Botswana, Swaziland
 2013 Idaho, Washington, Oregon
 2013-2014 Thailand, Vietnam, Cambodia, China
 2015 Nevada, California, Nauvoo, Illinois
 2016 Wyoming, Colorado, South Africa, Zimbabwe
 2017 Brazil
 2018 Utah, Arizona
 2018-2019 Southern California, People's Republic of China

Recordings

Albums 
Information retrieved from BYU Music Store.

 Tapestry: Weaving the Colors of Life (1993)
 Of One Heart (1995)
 The Neighborhood (1997)
 Come Unto Him: A Young Ambassadors Fireside Devotional (1999)
 Curtain Time (2000)
 Broadway Rhythm (2002)
 The Lord is My Light (2003)
 Circle of Life (2005)
 The New American Songbook (2008)
 Harmony: The Music of Life (2012)
 Heartsongs: Melodies of Love (2014)
 Welcome Home (2018)

Singles 
Information retrieved from Apple Music.

 Chicago Medley (2017)
 Yorktown: The World Turned Upside Down (2017)
 My Heavenly Father Loves Me (2016)
 Thinking Out Loud (2016)
 What Christmas Means to Me (2014)

Videos 

 Let it Ring (1987) on VHS
 Heartsongs: Melodies of Love (2014) on DVD

References

External links
 Official Young Ambassadors webpage
 BYU Performing Arts Management webpage for Young Ambassadors
 BYU Young Ambassadors Alumni
Young Ambassadors, UA 5395 Series 4 Suberies 28 Subseries 8 carton 3 folder 1-3 at L. Tom Perry Special Collections, Brigham Young University

Choirs in Utah
Brigham Young University
Musical groups established in 1970
1970 establishments in Utah
Harold B. Lee Library-related University Archives articles